Lathropatus is a monospecific genus of ovoviviparous velvet worm containing the single species Lathropatus nemorum. The type locality of this species is Cobboboonee National Park, Victoria, Australia. This species has 15 pairs of oncopods (legs).

References 

Onychophorans of Australasia
Onychophoran genera
Monotypic protostome genera
Fauna of Victoria (Australia)
Endemic fauna of Australia
Taxa named by Amanda Reid (malacologist)